The Inugamis can refer to:

 The Inugamis (1976 film), a 1976 Japanese film directed by Kon Ichikawa
 The Inugamis (2006 film), a 2006 Japanese film directed by Kon Ichikawa, a remake of his 1976 film